Armlin Hill is a mountain in Schoharie County, New York. It is located south-southwest of Middleburgh. Gates Hill is located south and Hony Hill is located northeast of Armlin Hill.

References

Mountains of Schoharie County, New York
Mountains of New York (state)